Fabián Alfaro (born September 23, 1981, in Copiapó) is a Chilean footballer who plays for Deportes Copiapó of the Primera B Chilena.

References
 Profile at BDFA 
 

1981 births
Living people
Chilean footballers
Cobresal footballers
San Marcos de Arica footballers
Deportes Copiapó footballers
Chilean Primera División players
Primera B de Chile players
Association football defenders
People from Copiapó